Albert Sacco Jr. (born May 3, 1949) is an American chemical engineer who flew as a Payload Specialist on the Space Shuttle Columbia on Shuttle mission STS-73 in 1995.

Born in Boston, Massachusetts, Sacco completed a B.S. degree in chemical engineering from Northeastern University in Boston in 1973, and then a Ph.D. degree in chemical engineering from the Massachusetts Institute of Technology in 1977. He then joined the faculty of the Worcester Polytechnic Institute, becoming a full professor and rising to department head in 1989.

Sacco served as the Dean of the Edward E. Whitacre Jr. College of Engineering at Texas Tech University, from January 1, 2011 to August 16, 2022.

Sacco flew as a payload specialist on STS-73, which launched on October 20, 1995, and landed at the Kennedy Space Center on November 5, 1995.

Sacco was originally chosen as the payload specialist for the ill-fated STS-107 mission, which ended in the Space Shuttle Columbia disaster. He trained with the other six astronauts for two months until NASA and the U.S. government decided to replace him with Israeli payload specialist Ilan Ramon.

References

 http://www.che.neu.edu/faculty/dr_albert_sacco_jr/ 

American astronauts
Northeastern University alumni
MIT School of Engineering alumni
Northeastern University faculty
Texas Tech University faculty
People from Boston
1949 births
Living people
Worcester Polytechnic Institute faculty
People from Belmont, Massachusetts
Space Shuttle program astronauts